Soroche (sometimes spelled sorojchi) can refer to:

Altitude sickness
the Cerro Soroche, a mountain in Ecuador
Soroche pills, an Andean mountain sickness medication
Soroche (plant), a species of South American flowering plant